The Karaite Kenesa of Kyiv is a former Kenesa (Karaite synagogue) in Kyiv, Ukraine. It is located in Yaroslaviv Val Street 7, close to the Golden Gates of Kyiv and is considered to be one of the remarkable monuments of architecture and artwork in Kyiv. Nowadays, it is known as the Ukrainian House of Actors.

History
The Karaite synagogue, designed by Władysław Horodecki, was built from 1898 to 1902 in the Moorish style. The building was decorated with a magnificent dome of great beauty with stucco decorations of Italian sculptor Emilio Sala using quite expensive at the time material - cement. It was constructed on funds of “tobacco kings” of South-Western land (the name of Ukraine during tsarist times) Solomon and Moses Kogen.

Karaites first appeared on the territory of modern Ukraine in the 1230s - almost immediately after the Mongol invasion of Kyivan Rus'. In 1795 the legislation of the Russian Empire established a distinction between the Karaites and Jews, freeing the former from the discriminatory double taxation. In 1896 the Karaite community of Kyiv consisted of 292 persons. For the purchase of land for the construction of Kenesa and a dwelling house (the proceeds of which would go to the benefit of Karaite community), Solomon Kogen has issued 35 000 rubles. Despite the fact that in 1897 he became paralysed, Solomon Kogen continued to manage his personal affairs and died in 1900. In his will, he bequeathed the funds to complete the construction of the synagogue. The construction was continued by his brother, Moses. It was spent about 200 000 rubles in total for the whole construction. The consecration of Kenasa was held on January 27, 1902, by Tauride and Odesa hakham Samuel Pampulov. The ceremony was attended by the vice-governor, mayor, chancellor and other officials.

During the Soviet times, Kenesa was handed to educational institutions, that’s what saved its unique interiors. During the German occupation, it has become, unexpectedly, a place for Roman Catholic services. The building was defiled during World War II by Nazis. Probably at this time it lost the dome which was part of the original structure (see picture, right). In a post-war period, the Puppet Theatre functioned there and afterwards, in 1952 – cinema. In the 1970s a contemporary wing was added to the building and it was converted into the Ukrainian House of Actors in 1981, remaining as such today. Unlike most of the other synagogues in Ukraine, it was not given back to the Karaite community after independence. The outward design of the building is slowly ruining because of time and exhaust gases. Under the influence of the gas-laden atmosphere and repeated painting, its color changed to dark, though in the first few decades it had a much brighter tint. One can see that on the sidewall of the building.

Gallery

References

Synagogues in Kyiv
Former synagogues in Ukraine
Moorish Revival architecture in Ukraine
Moorish Revival synagogues
Synagogues completed in 1902
Karaite synagogues
Architectural monuments of Ukraine of national importance in Kyiv